FDNY Racing, formerly named Jim Rosenblum Racing, Jocko's Racing, Linro Motorsports, and Golden Annie Racing, is an American professional stock car racing team that competes in the NASCAR Craftsman Truck Series, fielding the No. 28 Chevrolet Silverado part-time for Bryan Dauzat.

FDNY Racing consists of volunteers from the New York City Fire and Police Departments, with all winnings earned being donated to the Uniformed Firefighters Association Widow's and Children's Fund.

Team history

Jim Rosenblum
Jim Rosenblum (born January 9th, 1940), a native of Mamaroneck, New York, was a street drag racer in his youth. After being inspired by friend and 1960 Indianapolis 500 winner Jim Rathmann, he began competing in the Trans-Am Series in the 1960s, later winning a championship. He began owning stock car teams in 1968.

Rosenblum operates FDNY Racing with his own money. To continue running the team, in 2005, he cashed in his life insurance policy. His brother Norman, the former mayor of Mamaroneck, also works on the team.

In 2004, New York City Mayor Michael Bloomberg awarded Rosenblum the New York Posts Liberty Medal Award. Four years later, he was named an Honorary Battalion Chief by the FDNY.

Winston Cup Series
During the 1980s, Rosenblum formed Linro Motorsports, which began fielding cars in the NASCAR Winston Cup Series for friend Jocko Maggiacomo in 1983. He drove for the team until he was involved in a serious wreck at Pocono Raceway in 1988. In his place, Rosenblum hired sports car veteran Oma Kimbrough as a road course ringer for the Watkins Glen International races, which he ran in the No. 13 from 1989 to 1991.

Linro later established the Golden Annie Racing banner, which Randy LaJoie raced under at the turn of the decade. Other Cup drivers for Rosenblum included Eddie Bierschwale, Gary Balough, Jeff McClure, Bob Schacht and Kerry Teague until 1993 with No. 13, 27 and 29. Rosenblum's team had a best finish of 24th, accomplished twice by Maggiacomo and Kimbrough at Pocono and Watkins Glen, respectively.

After the creation of the Truck Series, Rosenblum fielded Cup and Truck teams until he shut down the former due to rising costs.

Truck Series

Truck No. 28 history
Rosenblum started a team in the Truck Series' inaugural 1995 season for Teague as the No. 51; Teague's best finish with the team was 13th, achieved at Tucson Raceway Park and Bristol Motor Speedway. In 1996, Rosenblum fielded one-off runs for T. J. Clark, Ritchie Petty, and Perry Tripp before shutting the team down due to monetary problems. They did one last attempt in 1997 with Terry McCarthy, but did not qualify. Two years later, he revived the operation and fielded trucks for Ronnie Hoover (1999) and Kenny Allen and Conrad Burr (2000). In 1999, they also changed the number to 28. Kenny Allen would then fail to qualify at Daytona in 2001. 

After the September 11 attacks in 2001, Rosenblum associated with retired firefighter Lt. Mike Bolnik, who suggested rebranding the team to support those affected. Partnering with RahMoc Enterprises owner Bob Rahilly, Rosenblum would rename the team FDNY Racing in 2002. Burr returned to the team in 2002, qualifying for all but one race in six attempts. Joe Ruttman also ran a race for the team at Darlington Raceway. Kenny Allen attempted Daytona in 2002 but didn't qualify. L. W. Miller would attempt Martinsville in 2002 but did not qualify. In 2003, L. W. Miller ran the first five races of the season. A year later, Buddy Davis failed to qualify the No. 28 at Indianapolis Raceway Park. Also in 2004, L. W. Miller attempted Daytona but did not qualify. 

In 2005, for the season opener at Daytona International Speedway, the truck ran with a decal stating "Always remember... never forget" and the names of firefighters Lt. Curtis Meyran, John Bellew, and Richard Sclafani; the three had died on Black Sunday in fires earlier in the year. The team attempted two races with David Ragan in 2005, including another run at Lowe's, but failed to qualify for both. The team made a return to a race in 2006 with Carl Long at Lowe's Motor Speedway. Long also made 2 other attempts, but he only made Charlotte. In 2007, Brandon Knupp did 2 races, and Shane Sieg attempted Martinsville. Sieg did not qualify. In 2008, Wayne Edwards attempted 4 races but made 2. In 2009, Andy Lally attempted 2 races but made one of them. Edwards returned at Charlotte, only to DNQ there. In 2010, L. W. Miller, Wayne Edwards, Andy Lally, and Chad McCumbee attempted races for the team. Lally and McCumbee made their races, while Miller and Edwards did not. Wes Burton raced for the team in 2011. Also in 2011, Grant Enfinger attempted Daytona but did not qualify. In 2012, Wes Burton returned to make 5 attempts but only made 1 of them. In 2013, Blake Koch and Dominick Casola contested a race each.  Also in 2013, Whelen Southern Modified Tour driver Andy Seuss attempted to make his series debut at Rockingham Speedway, but missed the race.

On January 22, he joined the team on a part-time basis starting with Daytona's NextEra Energy Resources 250. During the race at Charlotte, Ellis was involved in a crash with Jake Crum, which destroyed FDNY's truck. After receiving some funding from a GoFundMe campaign and Ellis' Kappa Sigma college fraternity, the team returned at Pocono. During the year, Whelen Modified Tour driver Bryan Dauzat made his Truck Series debut in the No. 28 at Bristol Motor Speedway, where he finished last after completing just four laps due to suspension problems. 2015 marked the FDNY's 150th Anniversary, during which FDNY and Ellis attempted three races, qualifying at Daytona and Bristol, where he finished 16th and 20th, respectively. Andy Seuss also tried to make Talladega that year as well, but missed the race.

Seuss returned to the team in 2016, finally making his Truck debut at Charlotte; qualifying was rained out and the team was in position to miss the race due to a lack of race attempts that year, prompting Rosenblum to make an agreement with MAKE Motorsports to take over MAKE's No. 1 truck for the race. He would finish last after crashing on lap 20. They would attempt Martinsville with Kyle Soper, but failed to qualify. In 2017 they attempted Daytona in February, failing to qualify with Dauzat. They returned with Dauzat at Pocono in July.

In February 2018, the team announced on their Facebook that the season-opening Truck race at Daytona would be their last with Rosenblum retiring. Dauzat drove the No. 28 to an 18th-place finish despite being caught up in a crash with Clay Greenfield and Korbin Forrister. Despite the initial announcement, FDNY Racing returned for that year's Talladega event, where Dauzat finished eighth for his and his team's first top-ten finish. During the season-opening 2019 NextEra Energy 250, Dauzat accidentally hit his jackman Billy Rock on pit road when his truck experienced braking problems. Rock was rushed to Halifax Health for his injuries and was diagnosed with a broken shoulder. He was released from the hospital shortly after.

Dauzat returned to FDNY and their No. 28 truck in 2020. He and the team ran more races than originally scheduled due to the fact that the field size for the Truck Series was expanded from 32 to 40 as a result of the cancellation of qualifying due to the COVID-19 pandemic.

On January 29, 2021, it was revealed that Dauzat would return for another part-time schedule in the FDNY No. 28 truck in 2021, beginning at the season-opener at Daytona and would also run Pocono and Talladega. In 2022, they would race at Daytona, Pocono, and Talladega. Dauzat will return in 2023, starting at Daytona once again.

References

External links
 
 

1983 establishments in North Carolina
American auto racing teams
New York City Fire Department